The Sideways Light is a 2014 American mystery drama film, written and directed by Jennifer Harlow. It stars Lindsay Burdge, Annalee Jefferies, Matthew Newton and Mark Reeb. The film had its world premiere at the Austin Film Festival on October 23, 2014. The film was released on video on demand on March 1, 2016 by Indican Pictures.

Premise
Lily is haunted by memories, meanwhile her mother Ruth is forgetting her own memories.

Cast
 Lindsay Burdge as Lily
 Bryn Langhout as Young Lily
 Annalee Jefferies as Ruth
 Matthew Newton as Aiden
 Mark Reeb as Sam
 Jeanne Evans as Nana
 Rocco Sisto as The Doctor

Release
The film had its world premiere at the Austin Film Festival on October 23, 2014. The film went onto screen at the Lone Star Film Festival,
and Atlanta Film and Video Festival, In August 2015, Harlow revealed on her Instagram account, she had signed a distribution deal for the film. The distribution later turned out to be Indican Pictures. The film was  released on video on demand on March 1, 2016.

References

External links

2014 films
2010s mystery drama films
American mystery drama films
Films scored by Daniel Hart
2014 drama films
2010s English-language films
2010s American films